Chiasmocleis mehelyi is a species of frog in the family Microhylidae.
It is endemic to Brazil.
Its natural habitats are moist savanna, subtropical or tropical moist shrubland, subtropical or tropical seasonally wet or flooded lowland grassland, intermittent freshwater marshes, and pastureland.
It is threatened by habitat loss.

References

Chiasmocleis
Endemic fauna of Brazil
Taxonomy articles created by Polbot
Amphibians described in 1997
Taxa named by Ulisses Caramaschi